Harry, A History: The True Story of a Boy Wizard, His Fans, and Life Inside the Harry Potter Phenomenon is a 2008 book by writer and webmistress of The Leaky Cauldron, Melissa Anelli. The book describes the Harry Potter phenomenon in detail. The book was published on November 4, 2008, by Pocket Books, and debuted at #18 on The New York Times paperback bestseller list.

References

Works based on Harry Potter
Books about books
Pocket Books books